She's Out of Control is a 1989 American independent coming of age comedy film directed by Stan Dragoti.  Starring Tony Danza, Ami Dolenz and Catherine Hicks. The original music score was composed by Alan Silvestri. The film was marketed with the tagline "She was Daddy's little girl. Now she's at that age when girls go wild, guys go crazy and Dads go nuts". The film was shot with the working title Daddy's Little Girl.

Plot 
Widower Doug Simpson is a radio manager from California who lives with his two daughters, Katie and Bonnie. When Katie turns 15, she feels it is time to start looking more grown up. She has been dating Richard, the boy next door, whom her father adores, since middle school. In addition, her unflattering wardrobe has been complemented by her thick glasses and full set of braces. When Doug leaves on a business trip, Katie transforms herself into a beauty with help from her father's girlfriend Janet Pearson.

When Doug returns, he is shocked to find boys from every walk of life interested in dating Katie. When his obsession with Katie and her boyfriends reaches extreme limits, Janet suggests that Doug needs psychiatric help and he seeks out an expert who gives him advice that goes wrong whenever it is applied. Through the latter half of the film, Katie has three boyfriends, two of whom she eventually stops dating. At the film's ending, Katie takes a class trip to Europe and reunites with Richard again – at which point Bonnie, her younger tomboy sister, begins her own dating spree. Doug also finds out the "expert" was anything but, as he never had a daughter himself.

Cast

Production
Initially written under the title Daddy’s Little Girl,producer Stephen Deutsch first saw the script when he was at New Century Productions, but he was unable to convince the company to make the film. Although Deutsch moved to Universal Pictures a year later, he remained unable to secure backing from studio executives. Around that time, the Weintraub Entertainment Group was getting started, and Deutsch gave the script to WEG executives David Kirkpatrick and Michael Roberts. The studio approved the project “within a few days.” Deutsch hired director Stan Dragoti because of his work on Mr. Mom  In January of 1989, it was announced Daddy's Little Girl would be missing its planned February 17th released date as it was not ready for marketing and distribution, the film's titled was changed to She's Out of Control the following month. The film was released in Europe as Keep Your Hands Off My Daughter.

Reception 
Based on 19 reviews, Rotten Tomatoes gave the film an approval rating of 11%, with an average rating of 3.5/10. On Metacritic, the film has a weighted average score of 20 out of 100, based on 11 critics, indicating "generally unfavorable reviews." 

Chicago film critic Roger Ebert gave the film the rare zero stars rating on his written review of the film, saying:

What planet did the makers of this film come from? What assumptions do they have about the purpose and quality of life? I ask because She's Out of Control is simultaneously so bizarre and so banal that it's a first: the first movie fabricated entirely from sitcom cliches and plastic lifestyles, without reference to any known plane of reality.

Chicago film critic Gene Siskel also gave the film zero stars, calling it "a lame comedy that barely resembles a real movie." During his TV review he reported that "when I saw She's Out of Control, I became so depressed I actually thought about quitting my job as a film critic." Only after seeing Say Anything... was his faith restored. Michael Wilmington of the Los Angeles Times called it "a sometimes funny, mostly media-referential movie without much real life; a high-tech, high-pro job that has a glamor-robot feel." Variety said that the film "picks up some wit and steam when Danza begins consulting a shrink ... For too much of its 95-minute running time, though, the film is loud, broad, and panders to the filmmakers' condescending conception of teenage tastes." Caryn James of The New York Times wrote, "Anyone who has watched television for even a night will be able to predict every scene in 'She's Out of Control' with total accuracy. It is an extended version of familiar, bland sitcom situations, with Mr. Danza playing a smoother-edged version of his character on the endlessly running hit 'Who's the Boss?'" Leonard Maltin's film guide gave it 1.5 stars out of 4, stating that it was a "superficial expanded sitcom with Danza offering a one-note performance," concluding with "this one seems as if it was spit out of a computer."

Soundtrack 
The soundtrack, distributed by MCA Records in April 1989, was released on vinyl, cassette tape and compact disc. The track listing includes:

 "Where's the Fire" – Troy Hinton
 "You Should Be Loving Me" – Brenda K. Starr
 "Concentration" – Phil Thornalley
 "The Loneliest Heart" – Boys Club
 "Hunger of Love" – Harold Faltermeyer
 "KHEY-FM Radio Sweeper" – Jim Ladd
 "Winning Side" – Oingo Boingo
 "Daddy's Little Girl" – Brian Wilson
 "Venus" – Frankie Avalon
 "You Really Got Me" – The Kinks
 "Feel the Shake" – Jetboy

Other songs featured in the film that did not appear on the soundtrack:
 Angel Baby – Beth Anderson
 Secret Agent Man – Johnny Rivers
 Oh Yeah – Yello

References

External links 
 
 

1980s coming-of-age comedy films
1980s teen comedy films
1989 comedy films
1989 films
1989 independent films
American coming-of-age comedy films
American independent films
American teen comedy films
Columbia Pictures films
1980s English-language films
Films directed by Stan Dragoti
Films scored by Alan Silvestri
Films set in Los Angeles
Films shot in Los Angeles
Weintraub Entertainment Group films
Films about father–daughter relationships
1980s American films